An antecedent is a preceding event, condition, or thing.

More specifically, antecedent may refer to:

 Antecedent (behavioral psychology), the stimulus that occurs before a trained behavior
 Antecedent (genealogy), antonym of descendant, genealogical predecessor in family line
 Antecedent (grammar), the previously occurring noun phrase to which a pro-form refers
 Antecedent (law), in crime, the history of a person
 Antecedent (logic), the first half of a hypothetical proposition
 Antecedent moisture, in hydrology, the relative wetness condition of a catchment
 Antecedent phrase (music)
 Generic antecedent, in language